

361001–361100 

|-bgcolor=#f2f2f2
| colspan=4 align=center | 
|}

361101–361200 

|-id=183
| 361183 Tandon ||  || Barthelemy Tandon (1720–1775), an astronomer of the Montpellier Royal Society of Sciences. He observed the 1761 transit of Venus. || 
|-id=193
| 361193 Cheungtaklung ||  || Cheung Tak-Lung (Zhang De-Long in Mandarin, 1946–2019), was a famous Chinese calligrapher from Guangdong province. He devoted his life to the study, practice, education and teaching of traditional Chinese calligraphy. In spite of his renown, Cheung remained a modest artist. Name proposed by Man-To Hui. || 
|}

361201–361300 

|-id=267
| 361267 ʻIʻiwi ||  || The ʻIʻiwi is a species of Hawaiian honeycreeper endemic to the islands of Hawai`i. It has a curved bill and red and black plumage, and is one of the most common native Hawaiian birds. It is present on most of the islands of Hawai`i, but is listed as a threatened species due to habitat loss and disease. || 
|}

361301–361400 

|-bgcolor=#f2f2f2
| colspan=4 align=center | 
|}

361401–361500 

|-id=450
| 361450 Houellebecq ||  || Michel Houellebecq (born 1958), a French author, filmmaker and poet || 
|}

361501–361600 

|-id=524
| 361524 Klimka ||  || Libertas Klimka (born 1940), a Lithuanian historian of science and physicist. Together with G. Kakaras, he organized the Lithuanian Museum of Ethnocosmology with public astronomical observatory in 1990. Klimka is the author of 10 popular books, as well as many popular and scientific publications. || 
|-id=530
| 361530 Victorfranzhess ||  || Victor Franz Hess (1883–1964), an Austrian physicist || 
|}

361601–361700 

|-id=690
| 361690 Laurelanmaurer ||  || Laurel Ann Maurer (born 1959), a musician and music teacher || 
|}

361701–361800 

|-id=764
| 361764 Antonbuslov ||  || Anton Buslov (1983–2014), a Russian astrophysicist, urbanist and blogger. || 
|}

361801–361900 

|-bgcolor=#f2f2f2
| colspan=4 align=center | 
|}

361901–362000 

|-bgcolor=#f2f2f2
| colspan=4 align=center | 
|}

References 

361001-362000